Ivanov Volodymyr Mykhailovych (: 28 November 1953) is a Ukrainian politician. Candidate of Pedagogical Sciences (1998), member of the Party of Regions (since 2005); former People's Deputy of Ukraine.

Early life 
He was born on November 28, 1953, in the village of Elgen, Yagodninsky District, Magadan Oblast, RSFSR. He is ethnic Russian. His father is Mikhail Filatovich (born 1925) and mother Praskoviya Sergeevna (born 1926). His wife Liubov Yegorivna (1953) has worked as a deputy director for educational work at school No. 2; son Serhiy (born 1976) is a well-known Ukrainian journalist and writer; daughter Natalia (born 1983) is a lawyer.

Education 
He studied Russian Language and Literature at Voroshilovgrad Pedagogical Institute named after T. Shevchenko, Faculty of Philology in 1971–1975. In 1995 he finished Ukrainian financial and banking school. During 1997-1999 he studied at Luhansk Institute of Internal Affairs.

Politics 
Ivanov was the People's Deputy of Ukraine of the 5th convocation (from April 2006 to the autumn of 2007) in the Party of Regions fraction.

Under the presidents of Kuchma and Yushchenko he worked as deputy head of the Luhansk regional state administration, and for some time managed to be a subordinate of the odious Oleksandr Efremov.

References

1953 births
Fifth convocation members of the Verkhovna Rada
Living people